Alexis Koutsias (born 28 November 2002) is a Greek professional footballer who plays as a left-back for Super League 2 club Episkopi.

References

2002 births
Living people
Super League Greece 2 players
Gamma Ethniki players
Panathinaikos F.C. players
Panionios F.C. players
Association football defenders
Footballers from Athens
Greek footballers